John Osborn Williams (28 March 1886 – 6 July 1963) was the owner of the logging and pit prop exporting business known as The Labrador Development Company limited based in Port Hope Simpson, Newfoundland and Labrador from 1934 to 1948.

Early life

Williams was born at 46 George Street, Cardiff, Wales, his parents' home, and was the youngest son of Silas and Mary Williams. He was one of eight children and known as "Jack" within the family.  He left school at age 14 in 1900 and entered the timber exporting business. "Jayo" as he was usually known, like two of his brothers Hiram and Arthur, became a commercial clerk at the age of fifteen.

The family's heavy industrial and clerical occupational experience was the background for at least two other logging, trading, and shipping agency companies he was to set up. In 1908, at 22 years of age, he moved to work for Evans and Reed, Cardiff coal exporters and importers of pit props. In 1914 during the First World War, he worked in the Baltic area, and in August of that year, he went to Montreal, spending September to December 1914 in Dominion of Newfoundland. From the end of the war, he sought to develop his business interests on the island. In 1921, he obtained £10,000 backing from Franklin Thomas and Company, Cardiff coal importer, to help him set up J. O. Williams Company in 1925. However, the liquidation of the British and North American Trading Company in which Williams had shares bankrupted him.

Development of the Labrador area
Before the company arrived at the present day site of Port Hope Simpson, certain events had taken place. It was on board the S.S. Sylvia en route to St. John's, Newfoundland from City of Halifax, Nova Scotia that Williams first discussed his ambitions for the Labrador with Sir John Hope Simpson, Commissioner of Natural Resources and Acting Commissioner of Justice 1934–36, and Thomas Lodge, Commissioner of Public Utilities from 1934 to 1937. He won them over with his enthusiasm, optimism and experience and convinced them he was just the sort of entrepreneurial man they were looking for. For their part, they could not believe their good luck in having met him. They viewed Williams as somebody who could help them make an impact in their new posts. Lodge described Williams to The Dominions Office in London as 1/3 visionary, 1/3 speculator and 1/3 businessman. However, time would tell that Simpson and Lodge had made a grave error of judgment about entering into a business relationship with Williams.

In June 1934 the first party of managerial and administrative staff landed at the site on the Alexis River. Williams had hired 520 men; southern Inuit men from nearby communities and unemployed men from the island of Newfoundland who came on government passes to work. He showed that some sort of permanent employment in addition to the cod fishery was possible in the area, and even though he brought south Labrador Inuit and Newfoundlanders together, most Newfoundlanders did not stay for more than two or three years.  However, because of southern Inuit families moving into the area to participate in the new economic projects, it was reported that there were almost 70 families in Port Hope Simpson in 1934.

Within one month, however, by 26 July 1934, 225 lumbermen of the Labrador Development Company returned to St John's because they were dissatisfied with their working conditions. Although the men were keen to work they found poor accommodation and little food. The company controlled everyone through the very strict manager and because Williams prohibited any buying and selling outside his store. (Although one enterprising local did bring a boatload of goods upriver to Port Hope Simpson, Newfoundland and Labrador, moored offshore and proceeded to do a brisk trade before he was stopped.) Workers were paid from $1.75 to $2.00 per cord (48 to 55-cent/m3) of pit-props, using a bucksaw for 12 hours per day. They were put on rations of mostly beans and porridge and bought deteriorating food from the company store. Men had to go out hunting to obtain sufficient food for themselves and their families. Many of the non-Inuit, not accustomed to the way of life came with dreams of prosperity but soon realised that conditions were the same as the fishery. They were always in debt! Eventually forcing most of them to move back to Newfoundland.

By 30 July 1934 Police Superintendent O'Neil had investigated the complaints of the 225 lumbermen and declared that there were no valid grounds for the strike although it was admitted that the preparations for the 500 men were inadequate when they arrived.

In August 1934 the first permanent settlement started at the site of a logging camp run by the Labrador Development Company and named after Sir John Hope Simpson. The first Company Town in Labrador had been born and large scale commercial development of the woods around Alexis and Lewis Bays for the export of pit props to south Wales had begun. Building development at Port Hope Simpson, by the winter of 1935, only consisted of a community hall and a hospital or seven-room medical clinic. A general store, a hall – also used as a church and a school – had also been erected at adjacent Mill Point cove.

But as early as November 1934, after Sir John Hope Simpson, who had agreed to Williams's suggestion that the settlement be named after himself, opening-up Simpson to accusations of favouritism, had returned to England over Christmas to meet with officials at the Dominions Office, it had become apparent that J. O. Williams had lost his government's support. When the Dominions Office found out that the 400 houses were not being built at Port Hope Simpson and money had effectively been borrowed under false pretences on Simpson's say–so it brought about a complete change in their attitude towards Simpson and Williams.

Simpson was recalled to the Dominions Office in November 1934 not on the pretence of some constitutional issue or other but to face severe reprimand for what he and Lodge had allowed to happen. He had failed spectacularly to get Williams to toe the line in repaying his debts because he feared that Williams would carry out his threat to pull out of Labrador and Newfoundland altogether. Williams, on the other hand, made no fundamental misjudgement about his economic prospects on the Labrador, because, by using borrowed government funds he proceeded to make money hand over fist from 1934 to 1940. By the time the Public Enquiry was held into Williams' affairs in 1945 his personal qualities of drive and persistence had become more than a thorough nuisance, as the Dominions Office had failed to get to the bottom of what he was up to. They were aware they had been hoodwinked and John Chadwick, one of the civil servants, believed he had seen a way out of the mess via a proposed public enquiry that would enable the government to cut all ties with Williams once and for all despite the blunders of their representative, Sir John Hope Simpson.

By 29 January 1935 it was clear that the Labrador Development Company was taking maximum advantage of the fact that exploitation of the woods could happen in an unregulated way. This state of affairs carried on from 1935 to 1940. It wasn't until after a government director was appointed to its board from 1940 and the Public Enquiry into its affairs took place in 1944 that Williams's activities were finally controlled.

On 4 June 1935 in a very confidential letter marked "secret and personal", Sir John Hope Simpson wrote that 200 families were being settled at the Alexis River site. Less than two weeks after Simpson wrote the above letter, the Commission of Government had supposedly taken over complete financial control of all properties in both of Williams' companies. That Simpson had moved so quickly in making such preparations is in direct contrast to the previously supportive way in which he had dealt with the company. In a letter on 5 July 1935 to Bridges, Clutterbuck at the Dominions Office wrote that plans were in sight for a permanent settlement. Two weeks later, Simpson wrote that the loggers were earning great wages of about $3.00 per day. In fact they were only earning at the very most about $1.30 per day. By September of that year, Simpson revealed he was looking for excuses to leave the scene in Newfoundland altogether.

By the end of 1936 in Port Hope Simpson, Newfoundland and Labrador, the Company had arranged for the men to build themselves about 60 small houses for rent but most Labradorians chose not to live in the company housing due to their rental costs, living instead about a quarter of a mile away on the opposite side of Black Water brook. In justification of the good works done by Williams, his counsel at the public enquiry in 1945 emphasised that the company had rendered every possible service at considerable cost to provide work for the people of Newfoundland and the needy families of Labrador. By so doing it was claimed it had adhered to the agreement made with the Commission of Government on 30 April 1934 that the government wished to do everything it could to help develop the Labrador and the company. Williams' counsel claimed that after years of work; the company had stabilised and had built up an efficient unit of workers who took an interest in their work and their employers.

By March 1938 Williams felt that government policy towards him had steadily deteriorated and by the time of the public enquiry in 1945 he was fighting a long lost cause. Disaffection with the Labrador Development Company representatives on site quickly set in whilst J O Williams was 3,000 miles away in Britain living in luxury in Cardiff city centre next door to Eric by 15 March 1938.

In a context of suspicious and acrimonious circumstances from his loggers and their families towards The Company, in the early hours of 3 February 1940, personal tragedy hit Williams as Eric Arthur Williams, his eldest son and Erica D'Anitoff Williams his infant daughter seemed to have died in a house fire in Port Hope Simpson. The cause of their deaths is yet to be established and foul play cannot be ruled out as part of the ongoing Royal Canadian Mounted Police R.C.M.P. Serious Crimes Unit Investigation opened in August 2002.

The date not only marked the first time the case had been moved from The Department of Natural Resources to the Department of Justice in Canada but also marked the first time, albeit 62 years later, that an investigation into the circumstances around the deaths took place which found that somebody may well have been "stirring the pot" as the people felt betrayed by Williams.

Eric had been sent out by his Father into a most difficult situation (where the loggers and their families had been kept in the dark about what had been going-on behind the scenes) to report on the issue of unauthorised stores having been bought for the Company Store (monopoly) operation in Port Hope Simpson. Eric ordered that excess stores be returned to St. John's and went beyond his Father's instructions by entering into the Keith Younge local contract for cutting pit props to be shipped out to South Wales although at the time this arrangement was seen as a good way of helping the Company to continue its operation in the area. But it was not to be...as Eric and his daughter were quite likely unlawfully killed.

According to the original correspondence within the Public Enquiry, Keith Younge, local Labrador Development Company Limited store manager ordered that the two bodies should be quickly buried and a concrete headstone inscribed and erected. Subsequently, a granite memorial stone as first seen in 1969 cut from the Preseli Hills of South Wales and shipped out by Williams replaced the smaller headstone and significantly, all mention of Olga D'Anitoff Williams, Eric's wife, by order of J O Williams from back in South Wales, was removed from the final epitaph. The Public Enquiry into the Financial Affairs of The Labrador Development Limited (kept in UK National Archives) clearly shows within its original correspondence that J O Williams considered Olga to be of a "bad character."

Williams' confidential letter to Keith Yonge in 1941 in which he admitted that he had the money but wanted to get as big a concession from the government as possible before disclosing his financial strength also indicates his level of deception. It was only after Williams and the Labrador Development Company had left Port Hope Simpson in 1948 that the people could set about bettering themselves, but by this time many had moved away in search of work.

The Public Enquiry was held in St. John's, Newfoundland and reported in 1945 into the affairs of the Labrador Development Company Limited. It was engineered by a group of six civil servants at the Dominions Office who wanted to show that Williams was of unreliable character. When Chief Justice Dunfield's report on the public enquiry came out it meant the Dominions Office's plan to discredit Williams' character had seriously backfired. The government wanted the report buried after local publication.

"On the whole, I should imagine that the Commission will be content to bury the main bodies of both reports as deeply as their publication locally permits."—Chadwick J. C., Dominions Office, London 29 June 1945

Judge Dunfield found that Williams had run out of liquid cash reserves that were essential to scale up the operations. He considered that the government was also responsible for the company and had pressed Williams to cut more timber to provide more work for the people. Dunfield knew that $19400 per annum of capital had to be re-paid to the government ($1.00 per cord (28-cent/m3) on limited production) plus the heavy interest on the government loan and that it was initially planned to cut 50000 cords (180000 m3) of timber per annum.

Dunfield's conclusion was that neither Williams nor the government fully appreciated how much the Port Hope Simpson project would cost and so the company was under-funded right from the start. It found itself in a vicious circle where it did not have sufficient funds to expand and, without the expansion, its overheads could not be carried. Dunfield clearly implied that he was not exactly confident about the financial health of the company from the outset.

His judgment was that the government went from being a supportive partner to being a strict creditor. Then the Second World War came and stopped the free export of pit props. The people from 1934 to 1939 received according to Dunfield, not less than $800,000 in wages when they might have been
on the dole.

Dunfield acknowledged Williams' particular line of skill, but thought that he was not experienced in other fields and that he himself had admitted so.

The $250,000 reinvestment Williams made in Labrador from his Newfoundland trade, coupled with the money from his Cardiff company hid the true position according to Dunfield, which was that the Labrador enterprise needed a much greater capital investment and a larger working capital than had been provided. Dunfield laid the blame firmly on Williams and said that the government was also to blame for failing to fulfil its partnership contribution in the circumstances. Dunfield thought the government lacked the right calibre of officials, with the right training to work successfully with Williams the business person. Dunfield went so far as to say in his final report that Williams should perhaps be given another chance.

Dunfield was in fact quite sympathetic towards Williams and definite that he was not entirely to blame for what had happened. He knew that the Government had gained more than it had lost on the venture and he would not swallow the vitriolic anti-Williams propaganda. He had found no evidence to justify the bad impression that other people and he had held before the start of the enquiry about Williams. Dunfield might have over-reacted against the very suggestion that he should take part in any sort of rigged public enquiry to attack Williams' character and discredit him. Instead, he recommended that the Government and Williams should try again.

In 1945 the population of Port Hope Simpson had been 352 which included 119 children. However, one year later from Williams's point of view, the situation had looked desperate,

"When I restarted at Hope Simpson in 1946 I was faced with a derelict township, everything that could be turned into cash was sold, or stolen, down to the office furniture....I have already spent over $20,000 putting the place right...The argument that we could not get the labour is absurd."—J. O. Williams, original correspondence 1945

Back in Britain on the one hand, the British treasury was trying to ensure that the UK taxpayer would not have to bear any loss incurred by the company if it went into liquidation. On the other hand, it also wanted to make absolutely certain the government were not going to be liable for any claim made by Williams for special compensation. Therefore, wanting to appear generous in public, within the modified terms of their final settlement, they offered to waive the interest on their loan from 30 June 1940 – 20 November 1945. The export of timber from Labrador would be free of all tax from 1946 to 1955 inclusive and then subject to an export tax of 0.25 cents per cord (0.07-cent/m3) from 1956 to 1966. Royalties on cutting were not payable and Williams was offered a fresh timber contract in 1946, which he accepted.

The treasury had been consistent over the years in its unwillingness to allocate Williams any more money because of his unreliability. Nevertheless, Williams was still granted a further $100,000 loan on 15 October 1946 that included excellent terms by the British government for his last timber contract – despite the fact that about half of the final contract of wood was left behind.

"...about the Labrador Development Company's contract with the Ministry of Supply to ship timbers to this country...Eales indicated that he expected production to be nearer the minimum figure of 8,000 fathoms than the maximum of 12,000; but it appears to have fallen much short of that. We seem to have been badly bamboozled."—Chadwick J. 20 January 1947

By the time the contract was completed Williams had definitely made up his mind not to continue with business in Newfoundland and Labrador any longer. Despite the very generous terms he was still claiming that the evidence entitled him to a fair settlement and he had been thinking about progressing into the fishing business in the area. He was very confident that the old Labrador crowd were ready to go back to work for him. However, in a press interview on 24 December 1945, he was quoted as saying that 165 men were logging at Port Hope Simpson, Newfoundland and Labrador but that 572 men who had been sent there in November had refused to work and had to be brought back and 20 more had demanded repatriation. Chadwick's view from the Dominions Office in the same year about the Labrador Development Company was that,

"Our aim was to end this sordid history one way or the other rather than allow matters to drift on as they have done for the past five years."—Chadwick J. 1945

The original correspondence from the Public Enquiry shows Chadwick was very eager to cut his losses from the Dominions Office's long-running affair with Williams and in the end Williams did not make a claim for financial compensation against the British government.

In a wider political context, Williams' efforts to keep alive the Labrador Development Company were going on when Newfoundland and Labrador were moving towards joining the Confederation of Canada in 1949. The obvious effect upon Williams was that he chose to close down his operations completely at Port Hope Simpson rather than pay federal taxes on the wood.

The affairs of the Labrador Development Company at Port Hope Simpson 1934–1949 were hushed-up because it would not have been in the public and national interest to have done otherwise. In the lead up to the Second World War, a climate of trust was vital in our political leaders. The last thing the United Kingdom and its steadfast ally Newfoundland wanted was to be distracted from the war by a relatively trifling dispute about what was going on at Port Hope Simpson. Newfoundland had already suffered from a lack of available work and the low wages of the Great Depression. It needed work for its population like never before and The Labrador Development Company appeared to be offering just that. However, the effect of the political shenanigans of Sir John Hope Simpson, John Osborn Williams, the Commission of Government and the Dominions Office upon the brave crowd of southern Inuit and transient Newfoundlanders in Port Hope Simpson was to make it impossible for them to find out what was going on behind the scenes.

Williams had borrowed the money from the Colonial Office's funds in London under false intentions. He subsequently failed to build the promised 400 houses for the loggers and their families and failed to pay them a reasonable living wage. They were held in poverty by the monopoly of the Company's store in the settlement as they were forced to live under its system of credit. The Royal Canadian Mounted Police investigating officer in 2003 about whether or not foul play had occurred in the early hours of 3 February 1940 stated that,

"He...Williams...betrayed the people and no doubt this would have stirred the pot enough for someone to have taken drastic measures by their own hands and started the fire at the house that led to the deaths of Eric, J.O.'s eldest son and Erica his infant daughter."—21 October 2003

Thomas Lodge concluded that it had been the Secretary of State for Canada who had failed to give guidance to the commission who were a collection of individuals running their own departments. He described the commission as an experiment in dictatorship and claimed he left his post because he could no longer carry on working with people who completely failed to agree on a positive policy and because he could not convince the Secretary of State to adopt his own point of view. The Dominions Office removed Lodge from his position of commissioner early in 1937 and the publication of his book Dictatorship in Newfoundland in 1939 put him out of favour in London. Nevertheless, he became a government director of the Labrador Development Company in 1940. Lodge would have been well-placed to have handled the two deaths.

Claude Fraser, Sir John Hope Simpson's loyal secretary of Natural Resources had been appointed to the post of Government Director of the Labrador Development Company Limited on exactly the same day as when the deaths occurred.

RCMP investigation about the events of 3 February 1940
On the following basis, the Royal Canadian Mounted Police Serious Crimes Unit based in St. John's, Newfoundland decided to open their own investigation in August 2002 into what had really happened in the early hours of 3 February 1940 in Port Hope Simpson: No pertinent Newfoundland Rangers Monthly Report on Living Conditions in the Port Hope Simpson district for February 1940 has been found written by Ranger Clarence Dwyer  or any other Ranger from the Port Hope Simpson Detachment. No medical report from the Doctor who apparently attended to Olga at the scene of the two deaths has been found. No death certificates for Arthur Eric Williams and Erica D'Anitoff Williams have been found. A consistent effort had been made over the years by Sir John Hope Simpson to keep the Newfoundland Rangers under the jurisdiction of the Natural Resources Department instead of under the Department of Justice. The grave's epitaph had been changed and apparent evidence discrepancies exist within its content. Unsatisfactory, unpaid wages and a severe lack of houses for the loggers and their families existed for the early settlers and contributed to suspicious, acrimonious circumstances surrounding the two deaths. A lack of local knowledge existed in 1969–70 about what had been going-on during the early years of the pioneer logging camp. There was no Government Director on the Company's board in St. John's at the time the deaths occurred. The Government appointments of Claude Fraser and Thomas Lodge to the Company's board of directors were meant to 'keep a lid' on things. The family tradition of secrecy  surrounding the two deaths also strongly suggests it is beyond coincidence that a cover-up involving at the very least, Government mismanagement continues to hide the truth about what really happened in the early hours of 3 February 1940.

References

External links
Alexis Bay History

References
 
 Tombstone, Port Hope Simpson
 
 The Port Hope Simpson Diaries 1969 - 70 Vol. 1
 
 The Port Hope Simpson Diaries 1969 - 70 Vol. 2
 
 Port Hope Simpson Off the Beaten Path
 
 Port Hope Simpson Historic Logging Town in Canada

 Port Hope Simpson Clues, Newfoundland & Labrador, Canada

 Legacy: Port Hope Simpson Town, Newfoundland and Labrador, Canada

 Port Hope Simpson Mysteries, Newfoundland and Labrador, Canada Oral History Evidence and Interpretation

 Rooted Forever in History

 The Port Hope Simpson Challenge

1886 births
1963 deaths
Businesspeople from Newfoundland and Labrador
Welsh emigrants to Canada
Canadian loggers
Businesspeople from Cardiff
People from Labrador
Politicians in Newfoundland and Labrador
20th-century Welsh businesspeople
19th-century Welsh businesspeople